Acinia is a genus of tephritid  or fruit flies in the family Tephritidae.

Species 
A. aurata Aczel, 1958
A. biflexa (Loew, 1844)
A. corniculata (Zetterstedt, 1819)
A. hendeli Aczel, 1958
A. ica Hering, 1941
A. jungsukae Kwon, 1985
A. macroducta Dirlbek & Dirlbekova, 1972
A. mallochi Aczel, 1958
A. obscura Aczel, 1958
A. peruana Aczel, 1958
A. picturata (Snow, 1894)
A. reticulata Aczel, 1958
A. tessariae (Kieffer & Jörgensen, 1910)

References

Tephritinae
Tephritidae genera
Taxa named by Jean-Baptiste Robineau-Desvoidy